Melo is a Portuguese surname. Variants include Mello, de Melo or de Mello, D'Melo or D'Mello, De Melo and De Mello.

People with the surname include:
Andrés Granier Melo (born 1948), Mexican Governor of Tabasco
António Barbosa de Melo (1932–2016), Portuguese politician and lawyer
Araquem de Melo (1944–2001), Brazilian footballer
Carlos Melo (born 1982), Panamanian boxer
Carlos Galvão de Melo (1921–2008), Portuguese Air Force officer and member of the National Salvation Junta after the 1974 Carnation Revolution
Custódio José de Melo (1840–1902), Brazilian admiral, who led the Brazilian fleet in two revolts in 1891 and 1893–4.
Daniel Melo (born 1977), Brazilian former tennis player, brother of Marcelo Melo
Eddie Melo  (1961–2001), Canadian boxer and gangster.
Ernesto Melo Antunes (1933–1999), Portuguese military officer who played a major role in the Carnation Revolution
Fabricio "Fab" Paulino de Melo (1990–2017), Brazilian basketball player who played for Syracuse University for two years. He was drafted in 2012 by the Boston Celtics as the 20th pick in the first round of the NBA Draft.
Fatima Moreira de Melo (born 1978), Dutch field hockey player
Felipe Melo (born 1983), Brazilian footballer
Fontes Pereira de Melo (1819–1887), Portuguese statesman, politician and engineer
Francisco de Melo (1597–1651), Portuguese-Spanish general and diplomat
Francisco Manuel de Mello (1608–1666), Portuguese writer
Froilano de Mello (1887–1955), Indo-Portuguese microbiologist, medical scientist, professor, author and independent Member of Parliament in the Portuguese parliament
Gilberto da Silva Melo (born 1976), Brazilian footballer
Jaime Melo (born 1980), Brazilian racing driver
Joaquim Melo (born 1949), Portuguese footballer
Jose Melo (born 1932), former Associate Justice of the Supreme Court of the Philippines
José Andrés Pacheco de Melo (1779-c. 1820), Argentine statesman and priest
José María Melo (1800–1860), Colombian president and general
José Artur de Melo Júnior (born 1987), Brazilian footballer
Laudelina de Campos Melo (1904-1991), created the first trade association for domestic workers in Brazil.
Leopoldo Melo (1869–1951), Argentine lawyer, diplomat and politician
Márcio Melo (1906–1991), Brazilian air force general
Marcelo Melo (born 1983), Brazilian tennis player
Pedro de Melo (1734–1797), Spanish soldier and Viceroy of the Rio de la Plata in South America
Sebastião José de Carvalho e Melo, 1st Marquess of Pombal (1699-1782), Portuguese statesman
Sérgio Vieira de Mello (1948–2003), Brazilian diplomat
Suzanne D'Mello, Indian playback singer
Túlio de Melo (born 1985), Brazilian footballer
Welington de Melo (1946–2016), Brazilian mathematician
Wélton Araújo Melo (born 1975), Brazilian former footballer
Zé Marco de Melo (born 1971), Brazilian beach volleyball player and silver medalist at the 2000 Summer Olympics

Portuguese-language surnames